The Church of England border polls 1915–1916 were a series of referendums held in January and February 1915 (with second polls being held in two parishes in March 1916), for residents of living in nineteen Church of England ecclesiastical parishes, the boundaries of which crossed the England–Wales border. They were carried out to determine if the parish residents wished their parish to remain part of the Church of England or to become part of the Church in Wales when the Welsh Church Act 1914 took effect. (Its implementation was delayed because of the First World War and it did not take effect until 31 March 1920). The polls eventually resulted in all but one of the border parishes voting to remain with the Church of England.

Background 
The Welsh Church Act 1914 was passed by parliament to disestablish the Church of England in Wales and Monmouthshire. Section 9 of the Act provided for the Commissioners for Church Temporalities in Wales (commonly called "The Welsh Church Commissioners") to hold referendums in the nineteen areas defined as "border parishes", parishes whose ecclesiastical boundaries straddled the temporal boundary between England and Wales, to decide if the parish wanted to join the Church in Wales when it was disestablished or to remain part of the established Church of England. Section 9 of the Welsh Church Act required the Commissioners to ascertain "the general wishes of the parishioners" but did not specify how "parishioners" was to be defined. The Commissioners therefore interpreted the provision broadly. The Welsh Church Act provided that the Church in Wales parishes would no longer retain private endowments granted to them before 1662 (though this was later partly compensated for by the Welsh Church (Temporalities) Act 1919).

Electorate 
The eligibility to vote in the ballots was extended to all men and women over 21 who lived in the respective parishes; non-resident ratepayers were also entitled to vote. The inclusion of all men and women over 21 extended the voting franchise beyond the limited franchise given to women by the Local Government Act 1894. It was one of the first examples of universal suffrage in the United Kingdom prior to the introduction of the Representation of the People (Equal Franchise) Act 1928, which gave women the same voting rights as men in parliamentary elections. However, the extended franchise meant that there was no suitable register for the Commissioners to use, which exacerbated their difficulties in holding the elections. They also posted ballot papers to parishioners serving in the Forces. Turnout for the votes was high compared to other elections.

Results 
The results of the referendums were given as a Written Answer in the House of Commons by the Home Secretary, Reginald McKenna. When reporting, the Commissioners took the view that, in spite of the difficulty in conducting the elections, in all the 17 parishes for which results were published there was a "marked preponderance of opinion" in favour of remaining part of the Church of England, so they needed to take no further action. The results of the ballots in Llansilin and Rhydycroesau were not published as they were deemed to be too close to call. A second referendum, using a more precise ballot, was therefore held in March 1916. Rhydycroesau voted to remain with the Church of England, and Llansilin was the only parish to vote in favour of joining the Church in Wales.
Because of the results, when disestablishment did happen in 1920, parishes and churches which were in a Welsh diocese were transferred to nearby Church of England dioceses for episcopal oversight. For example, Holy Trinity Church, Sarn in Wales was part of the Diocese of St David's but as that became a diocese of the Church in Wales, it was transferred to the Church of England's Diocese of Hereford.

Notes

Footnotes

References 

Church of England border polls
Church of England border polls
Church of England border polls
Church of England border polls
Anglicanism in the United Kingdom
Church of England
Church in Wales
Referendums in England
Referendums in Wales
Border polls
Women's suffrage in the United Kingdom